Cocooned is a 2021 Irish documentary film by documentarian Ken Wardrop, which explored the older generation's reactions to be being confined during the various stages of the COVID-19 pandemic in Ireland. Aired on 27 September 2021 on RTÉ One, it celebrated the resilience and bravery of Ireland's older generation and honoured their acceptance and grit in the face of adversity.

Filmed from March 2020 to January 2021, the documentary featured 11 men and women aged over 70 talking about their experiences, thoughts and insights as they cocooned during the pandemic. Filmed primarily at night through peoples' windows while conversations were recorded on telephones, it showcased the calm eeriness of Ireland's national lockdowns. The film began with drone shots of an empty Dublin, along with then-Taoiseach Leo Varadkar's speech to the nation on St Patrick's Day 2020 and ended with the third lockdown in January 2021.

References

External links
 Cocooned on RTÉ Player

2021 documentary films
2021 films
2021 television films
2021 in Irish television
COVID-19 pandemic in the Republic of Ireland
RTÉ original programming